Nessan Quinlivan (born  1965), is a former Provisional IRA member who escaped from Brixton Prison in London on 7 July 1991 along with his cellmate Pearse McAuley, while awaiting trial on charges relating to a suspected IRA plot to assassinate a former brewery company chairman, Sir Charles Tidbury.

In April 1993, he was arrested in the Republic of Ireland, on firearms charges, and was sentenced to four years in prison. In November 1996, he was released from Portlaoise Prison as part of the Irish government's early release programme for republican prisoners.

In April 2000, the High Court stated that he should be extradited to Britain, to face charges of conspiracy to murder and to cause explosions as well as escaping from prison and wounding with intent. Quinlivan claimed that it would be pointless to extradite him, because under the terms of the Belfast Agreement, he would have had to be freed by July 2001.

In August 2009, the Crown Prosecution Service in Britain announced it was no longer seeking the extradition of Quinlivan and McAuley.

His brother Maurice is a Sinn Féin TD for Limerick City. In early 2009 the arrest of three women, who were running a brothel in an apartment Nessan Quinlivan owned and was leasing to them, triggered a series of events that would lead to the resignation of the Minister of Defence Willie O'Dea.

References

1960s births
Escapees from England and Wales detention
Irish male criminals
Irish escapees
Irish republicans
Living people
People from Limerick (city)
Provisional Irish Republican Army members
Republicans imprisoned during the Northern Ireland conflict